Tatlıpayam is a village in the Baskil District of Elazığ Province in Turkey. The village is populated by Kurds of the Parçikan tribe and had a population of 72 in 2021.

The hamlets of Kiziruşağı and Sincan are attached to the village.

References

Villages in Baskil District
Kurdish settlements in Elazığ Province